William Pratt (1932 – 18 February 2009) was an English professional rugby league footballer who played in the 1950s.

Background
Billy Pratt's birth was registered in Leeds South, West Riding of Yorkshire, England, and he died aged 76 in Shipley, West Yorkshire, England.

Club career
Billy Pratt made his début for Leeds against Wakefield Trinity at Belle Vue, Wakefield on Wednesday 2 April 1952, he missed the majority of the 1952–53 season while on military service, the consistent form of Leeds' regular ; Jeff Stevenson, meant that before the start of the 1958–59 season Billy Pratt was transferred to Halifax. Keith McLellan, George Broughton Jr. and Joe Anderson also left the Leeds before the start of the 1958–59 season.

Notable tour matches
Billy Pratt played, and scored a try in Leeds' 18-13 victory over Australia in the 1956–57 Kangaroo tour of Great Britain match at Headingley Stadium in October 1956, as of 2017 this is the last time Leeds have beaten Australia.

References

External links
Search for "Pratt" at rugbyleagueproject.org
Search for "William Pratt" at britishnewspaperarchive.co.uk
Search for "Billy Pratt" at britishnewspaperarchive.co.uk
Search for "Bill Pratt" at britishnewspaperarchive.co.uk

1932 births
2009 deaths
English rugby league players
Halifax R.L.F.C. players
Leeds Rhinos players
Rugby league halfbacks
Rugby league players from Leeds